Gamiyakh (Mini-Ataġa) is a rural locality (a selo) in Barchkhoyotarsky Selsoviet, Novolaksky District, Republic of Dagestan, Russia. The population was 2,528 as of 2010. There are 23 streets.

Geography 
Gamiyakh is located 12 km southwest of Khasavyurt, on the bank of the Yamansu River. Novochurtakh and Zoriotar are the nearest rural localities.

Nationalities 
Chechens, Avars and Laks live there.

References 

Rural localities in Novolaksky District